The Great Cheese Robbery is a silent short animated film made by Bray Productions featuring Krazy Kat. It marks the first Krazy film produced by Bray after the International Film Service (IFS) ended its run in making films in the series.

Plot
One evening, Krazy Kat pulls a newspaper from a trash barrel and reads of unsolved cheese robberies in town. Moments later he spots a masked Ignatz Mouse heading down the street and follows him.

Outside a cheese store, Walter, an ostrich policeman, hears footsteps approaching and, frightened, sticks his head in the ground, allowing Ignatz to enter the store unseen, as does Krazy moments later. Inside, Ignatz devours an entire wheel of cheese and crams another into his bag. Upon hearing a banging on the door, Ignatz hides and Krazy enters, only to be mystified over the empty room. Having been attracted by the racket, Walter comes in, mistakes Krazy for the bandit and arrests him.

The next morning Ignatz is highly amused over a newspaper report of the arrest and the $10,000 bail for the prisoner. But soon he has a severe attack of conscience with illusions of monstrous shapes pointing accusing fingers at him. He snatches a sack of money from a hiding place, rushes to the police station and pays the bail. Krazy is astonished when he sees it's been paid by Ignatz.

Alternate ending
In a short version of the film called Rescued by a Guilty Conscience which was distributed by a company called Keystone for their toy projectors, there is an alternate ending. In it, Krazy, upon being bailed, suddenly becomes more insane than usual as he starts seeing a ghostly marsupial in wings as a result of being held in custody for many hours. As an act of generosity, Ignatz hurls the sack of cash at Krazy to snap the cat out of it.

Home media
The short film was also released in 2004 in a DVD video compilation called George Herriman's Kinomatic Krazy Kat Kartoon Klassics.

References

External links
The Great Cheese Robbery at the Big Cartoon Database

1920 films
1920 animated films
1920 short films
1920s American animated films
1920s animated short films
American black-and-white films
American silent short films
Animated sports films
Krazy Kat shorts
American animated short films
Bray Productions films
Animated films about cats
Films about theft